John Smyth (1796–1860) was a Scottish minister who served as Moderator of the General Assembly for the Free Church of Scotland 1853/54.

Early life
John Smyth was born in Ayr in 1796, the son of an officer in the Army. After studying divinity at the University of Edinburgh he was employed as a tutor in the family of Thomas John Fordyce of Ayton. He was licensed by the Presbytery of Chirnside on 14 August 1821. Later he became assistant minister at Canongate, Edinburgh, and to Dr Chalmers in St John's, Glasgow. He was presented by the Magistrates and Town Council 6 December 1822 and ordained on 20 February 1823 as minister of St George's in Glasgow, living in a manse on Stirlings Road. He was awarded a doctorate in divinity D.D. by Glasgow University on 5 April 1830.

After the Disruption
In the Disruption of 1843 he left the established Church of Scotland to join the Free Church of Scotland. St Georges (on Bath Street) was one instance where the entire congregation moved to the Free Church, thereby not requiring a new building.

In 1853 he succeeded the Very Rev Angus Makellar as Moderator. He was succeeded in turn by the Rev James Grierson in 1854. He was then living at 17 Elmbank Place.

Smyth died in 1860. St George's was sold in 1864 and renamed St David's, with a new St George's then being built.

Publications

Three occasional Sermons (Glasgow, 1829–47)
A Treatise on the Forgiveness of Sins (Glasgow, 1830)
The Popish Anti-Christ, his Character and Doom (Glasgow, 1848)
Lectures I. (On Infidelity)
X. (On the Evidences of Revealed Religion)
VI. (To Young Men)

Family

He was twice married:
(1) 30 August 1825, Margaret (died 17 September 1832), daughter of Samuel Davidson, surgeon, Culross, and had issue —
Christian Davidson, born 18 September 1826
Helen Chalmers, born 20 January 1828
(2) 10 June 1834, Violet Isabella (died 8 July 1875), daughter of General William Lockhart of Milton Lockhart, and had issue — 
Catherine Lockhart, born 1 January 1836.

Artistic recognition

He was photographed by Hill & Adamson in 1843. He was photographed in 1860 (illustrated right) at the foot of the steps to New College with several other ex-Moderators of the Free Church.

References
Citations

Sources

1796 births
1860 deaths
People from Ayr
Alumni of the University of Edinburgh
19th-century Ministers of the Free Church of Scotland